Rhyacophila formosa is a species of free-living caddisfly in the family Rhyacophilidae. It is found in North America.

References

Further reading

 
 
 

Trichoptera